KTHQ (92.5 FM "Q Country 92.5") is a radio station licensed to serve Eagar, Arizona, United States. The station is owned by William and Mary Ann Konopnicki through licensee WSK Family Credit Shelter Trust UTA. It airs a country music format.

The station was assigned the KTHQ call letters by the Federal Communications Commission on December 13, 1989.

Translators

References

External links
 KTHQ official website
 

THQ
Country radio stations in the United States
Mass media in Apache County, Arizona